The United Kingdom Linguistics Olympiad (UKLO) is a linguistics competition for primary and secondary school students in the United Kingdom. The competition is divided into four levels: Breakthrough, Foundation, Intermediate and Advanced, collectively known as 'Round 1', with the top-scoring 5% of entrants at Advanced level (formerly the top 16 entrants) eligible for a follow-on round, called 'Round 2'  and selection for participation in the International Linguistics Olympiad, one of the international science olympiads. In 2009, teams from two schools competed in a pilot competition, with the winners taking part in the international contest as guests of the All-Ireland Linguistics Olympiad. In 2010, an independent olympiad was created and has taken place every year since.

History 

Problem-solving competitions in linguistics for secondary school students have been taking place around the world since the 1960s. In Russia, the Moscow and St Petersburg Linguistic Olympiads are credited with inspiring hundreds of young talented scholars to choose linguistics as an academic major and profession. Currently there are national contests within Europe, North and South America, Africa, Asia and Australia. There is also an International Linguistics Olympiad in which students from many countries compete, which began in 2003, and was first hosted by Bulgaria.

In 2009, two UK schools, the Manchester Grammar School and Downlands Community School, took part as guests in the Irish competition, and the winning team represented the UK at the International Olympiad. This triggered the foundation of a permanent committee for the UK Linguistics Olympiad, and the creation of a consortium of olympiads held in English-speaking countries, ELCLO, as a means for pooling resources with NACLO, AILO and OzCLO, the American, Irish and Australian Linguistics Olympiads respectively. The UKLO committee is chaired by Dick Hudson, with Neil Sheldon serving as vice-chair.

In 2010, 560 students from 28 schools entered, 223 at Foundation, and 337 at Advanced level. In 2011,  1165 entries were received from 49 schools, 349 at Foundation, and 816 at Advanced level. 2012 saw the introduction of the Intermediate level, with 1912 entries from 300 schools, 432 at Foundation, 498 at Intermediate and 982 at Advanced level. 2013 saw total entries number 2878, with 1069 at Foundation, 643 at Intermediate and 1166 at Advanced level. In 2015, a new, lowest entry level was introduced, called Breakthrough, with 96 entrants. By 2018, the numbers had increased to 220 in Breakthrough, 1042 at Foundation, 970 at Intermediate and 1650 at Advanced.

The Olympiad has sponsorship and support from various organisations including the British Academy, The Linguistics Association of Great Britain, The British Association for Applied Linguistics, The Philological Society, Routes into Languages, The School of English Literature, Language and Linguistics, University of Sheffield and The School of Philosophy, Psychology & Language Sciences, University of Edinburgh.

The Olympiad has received coverage in the first and second issues of Babel magazine, as well as in the Francophonie journal and Attain magazine. Olympic athlete Christine Ohuruogu MBE is the patron of UKLO, having completed a Linguistics degree at University College London.

The UK has sent a delegation to the International Linguistics Olympiad (IOL) every year since 2009, and has competed in 11 olympiads. They have sent 68 participants in 17 teams, selected through UKLO. In competition, teams from the UK have brought home 34 medals (13 gold, 8 silver and 13 bronze), 3 team trophies (1 gold and 2 bronze), 1 first-place team cup, 3 best solution prizes, and 12 honourable mentions. In addition, the UK has sent 5 Repeat Medalists and 3 Dream Teams to the Hall of Fame. The UK Linguistics Olympiad was the host for the 2013 IOL, held at the Manchester Grammar School and chaired by Neil Sheldon. The competition in Manchester was featured on an edition of BBC Radio Four's Word of Mouth programme centring on language games.

Format 

The competition is divided into two rounds. Round 1 is open to all secondary school pupils, while Round 2 is invitation only.

10 linguistic data problems are posed in each year's Round 1 papers, with the Breakthrough paper being 1–3, Foundation 2–5, Intermediate 4–7, and Advanced 6–10. The intention is that each problem is harder than the previous. At Breakthrough, Foundation and Intermediate levels, participants may enter either individually or as part of a group of 2-4 students, and timings and conditions can be decided by schools. At the Advanced level, the competition must take the format of an individual, 2.5 hour test sat under controlled conditions. Certificates are awarded for top-scorers at each level, with the top 5% receiving Gold certificates, the next 10% Silver, and the next 20% Bronze.

As of 2022, winners of a Gold certificate at the Advanced level are invited to participate in Round 2. This is a 3.5 hour paper posing five more problems, some of which require written explanations. High-scoring students again receive certificates, with the top 25% receiving a Distinction, and the next 25% receiving a Merit. About twelve competitors are invited to attend a training camp at a host university, where eight competitors in two teams are selected to participate in the International Linguistics Olympiad and represent the UK. Selection is based mostly on performance in the Round 2 paper and the camp, but past performances at IOL and Round 2 are taken into account. Previously, roughly 16 of the top scorers from the Advanced paper were invited to participate in Round 2, which took the form of a residential training weekend at a host university, followed by the exam.

IOL Teams 

Since 2009, the UK has sent teams annually to the IOL.

IOL 2009

Team Leader: Neil Sheldon

IOL 2010

Team Leader: Neil Sheldon

IOL 2011

Team Leader: Neil Sheldon

IOL 2012

Team Leader: Neil Sheldon

Note: This team was entered into the IOL Hall of Fame as a "Dream Team" because all members of the team received a medal.

IOL 2013

Team Leaders: Neil Sheldon and Nathan Somers

IOL 2014

Team Leader: Neil Sheldon

IOL 2015

Team Leader: Neil Sheldon

IOL 2016

Team Leader: Neil Sheldon

IOL 2017

Team Leaders: Neil Sheldon and Elysia Warner

IOL 2018

Team Leaders: Neil Sheldon and Elysia Warner

IOL 2019

Team Leaders: Neil Sheldon and Graeme Trousdale

IOL 2020 
The IOL competition in 2020 was postponed until 2021 due to the Covid-19 pandemic. However, the UK still selected a squad of eight, consisting of Adrian Sahani, Benedict Randall Shaw, Hari Prasad, Kilian Meissner, Robbie Bennett, Sam Corner, Simeon Hellsten, and Soren Choi.

IOL 2021

Team Leaders: Neil Sheldon and Graeme Trousdale

IOL 2022

Team Leaders: Neil Sheldon and Graeme Trousdale

Notes 

1.In 2021, the squad of 8 were selected from R2, and a planned training camp was cancelled due to the Covid-19 pandemic.

References 

Linguistics olympiads
Language education in the United Kingdom